The NCAA Men's Division I Indoor Track and Field Championship is an annual collegiate indoor track and field competition for men organised by the National Collegiate Athletic Association. Athlete's individual performances earn points for their institution and the team with the most points receives the NCAA team title in track and field. A separate NCAA Division I women's competition is also held. These two events are separate from the NCAA Men's Division I Outdoor Track and Field Championships and NCAA Women's Division I Outdoor Track and Field Championships held during the spring. The first edition of the championship was held in 1965. The current team champions are the Oregon Ducks.

Events

Track events
 
Sprint events
60 meter dash (1999–present)
200 meter dash (1988–present)
400 meter dash (1984–present)
Distance events
800 meter run (1965–present)
Mile run (1965–present)
3,000 meter run (1965–present)
5,000 meter run (1989–present)
Hurdle Events
60 meter hurdles (1999–present)
Relay events
1,600 meter relay (1965–present)
Distance medley relay (1967–present)

Field events
 
Jumping events
High jump (1965–present)
Pole vault (1965–present)
Long jump (1965–present)
Triple jump (1968–present)
Throwing events
Shot put (1965–present)
Weight throw (1966–present)
Multi-events
Heptathlon (2004–present)

Discontinued events
Discontinued events
60 yard dash (1965–1983)
55 meter dash (1984–1998)
55 meter high hurdles (1965–1998)
440 yard dash (1965-1983)
600 yard run (1965-1983)
500 meter run (1984–1987)
1,000 meter run (1965–1987)
Three-mile run (1974–1982)
3,200 meter relay (1965–1993)

Champions

Team titles

Championship Records

See also
NCAA Men's Outdoor Track and Field Championship (Division I, Division II, Division III)
NCAA Women's Outdoor Track and Field Championship (Division I, Division II, Division III)
NCAA Men's Indoor Track and Field Championship (Division II, Division III)
NCAA Women's Indoor Track and Field Championship (Division I, Division II, Division III)
Pre-NCAA Outdoor Track and Field Champions

References

External links
NCAA Division I men's indoor track and field

 Indoor
NCAA men Division I
Track Indoor
Men's athletics competitions